Rija is a small settlement in Jubek State, South Sudan, about 6 km east of Dollo and 60 km west and 15 km south of the state capital Juba.

References

Populated places in Jubek State